SuperFuckers (censored as SuperF#@%ers, SuperF*ckers or SuperF***ers) is an American adult animated comic book series created by James Kochalka and published by Top Shelf Productions between 2005 and 2007. The series revolves around a collection of crude and rude superheroes who never actually do any superhero work. A collection was published on May 18, 2010, including four issues along with a new Jack Krak one-shot. The first issue is numbered #271 An animated web series based on the comic, produced for Frederator Studios' Cartoon Hangover channel on YouTube, was streamed between November 30, 2012 and May 4, 2013.

Characters
Jack Krak (voiced by David Faustino) is the egotistical leader of the SuperFuckers; he refers to himself as "the motherfucker". His two best friends are Ultra Richard and Shitstorm. His suit was originally black, but later wears a new white costume upon his conversion to Christianity. Jack's superpower is throwing devastating super-charged punches.
Ultra Richard (voiced by Phil Morris) is one of Jack's two best friends. He's immature, but also manages to be a gentleman. He has X-ray vision. 
Shitstorm (voiced by James Kochalka) is a piece of Jack's feces in a suit Wonder Kyle originally invented for Grotus that would translate his gurgling speech into English.  Jack defecated into the suit, and the feces came to life as a new entity. Shitstorm has a loud, wild, and brash personality, and is addicted to partying.
Grotessa (voiced by Veronica Belmont) is a somewhat rude superhero whose powers center around grossness. Her pet slime blob is Grotus. She hates having people insult Grotus. She's enemy roommates with Princess Sunshine. She is often mistreated by the other members because of her appearance and attitude. She has a crush on Vortex.
Princess Sunshine (voiced by Maria Bamford) is a pretty blonde-haired superhero. She's also Jack's love interest and Superdan's ex-girlfriend, though their relationship hasn't been specified. She hates Grotessa and Grotus because she finds them both to be disgusting and is annoyed by Computer Fist because of his crush on her.
Grotus (voiced by James Kochalka) is Grotessa's pet slime blob.  His slime has the effect of a hallucinogenic drug which the team has used to get high; it's this very drug that causes Jack to destroy the entire Earth under the influence of Grotus' slime in the finale of the web series, "Chug the Drug".
Wonder Kyle (voiced by Ted Biaselli) is a very mature and smart member of the SuperFuckers. He speaks in an effeminate voice, and is a religious Christian who holds dear a framed photo of his grandmother - he never wants to be embarrassed in front of said photograph. Jack often assumes that Wonder Kyle is gay. Wonder Kyle is also an inventor, having built a suit for Grotus with a built-in translator, but Jack defecates into it, thus creating "Shitstorm". 
Computer Fist (voiced by Maria Bamford) is the SuperFuckers' new recruit. He wears metal computer gloves, which is why his name is "Computer Fist". He has a crush on Princess Sunshine and dreams of marrying her someday, however Ultra Richard has tried to make it clear to him that she won't ever like him. He used to be friends with Pink Arrow, Plant Pal and Rocket Power. 
Super Dan (voiced by Jeff B. Davis) is a blonde haired superhero who tends to be oblivious to what is going on around him, and typically pays no attention to whatever his sidekick Percy says. He's trapped in Dimension Zero, but is unaffected by the radiated atmosphere, due to his invulnerability.
Percy (voiced by Jaleel White) is Super Dan's neglected sidekick. Like Super Dan, he's also trapped in Dimension Zero, but because he is a normal human, he is constantly seen damaged by the atmosphere of Dimension Zero. His skin gradually burns off in "Burger Brothers" and "Dawn of Omnizod", but Super Dan doesn't give it much attention. In "Dawn of Omnizod", as a result of his skin burning off completely, he turns into Omnizod, a flaming skull. In the comics, it is said that Omnizod is a monster in Dimension Zero that took control of Percy's skull and haunts it.
Orange Lightning (voiced by Justin Roiland) is a member of the SuperFuckers who has electricity powers. He is good friends with both Jack Krak and Ultra Richard; the three of them get high off of Grotus' slime in "Chug the Drug".
Vortex (voiced by Justin Roiland) is a nerdy, sometimes apathetic member of the SuperFuckers who doesn't have a costume, but has the power to create portals in space-time. He's Grotessa's love interest and seems to reciprocate her feelings. In "Chug the Drug", he is guarding a Time Capsule that houses a contained universe that when let out could mean the end of the world, but a drugged Jack shatters it, causing the entire Earth to explode.
Pink Arrow (voiced by Ed Skudder) is a hero with a pink haircut, a pink suit, and pink arrows. He wants to be a member of the SuperFuckers but doesn't seem to have a lot of luck getting in. He is envious of Computer Fist being accepted into the team, and attempts to kill him out of jealousy, but ends up shooting Jack with an arrow instead, sending him into a coma.
Rocket Power (voiced by Zack Keller) is a male hero with a jet pack he uses "to fuck shit up and stuff". He has a short temper and has an implied rivalry with Radical Randy.
Plant Pal (voiced by Phil Morris) is a "friend to plants" who wears a plant costume. His powers haven't been seen on screen, but it's implied by his name and background that he can manipulate plants.
Radical Randy (voiced by Ron Robinson) is a male hero with yellow skin, yellow hair, and uses drugs to try to gain superpowers. In "Scrimple's Delight", he overdoses on the drug "xaxxax" and turns into a large, yellow, lumpy monster, then dismembers Rocket Power in a fit of rage.

Media

Comic book series
An adult-rated comic book series created by James Kochalka and published by Top Shelf Productions between 2005 and 2007.

Animated series
A flash animated web series based on the books has been produced by Frederator Studios in collaboration with Top Shelf Productions and Bardel Entertainment for Cartoon Hangover. The series was streamed on YouTube in both censored and uncensored versions between November 30, 2012 and May 24, 2013. Pink Arrow and Rocket Power are voiced by the creators of Dick Figures.

Cast
David Faustino as Jack Krak
Phil Morris as Ultra Richard, Plant Pal
Veronica Belmont as Grotessa
Maria Bamford as Princess Sunshine, Computer Fist
James Kochalka as Grotus, Shitstorm
Ted Biaselli as Wonder Kyle
Jaleel White as Percy / Omnizod
Jeff B. Davis as Plant Pal, Super Dan
Justin Roiland as Orange Lightning, Vortex
Zack Keller as Rocket Power
Ed Skudder as Pink Arrow
Ron Robinson as Radical Randy
Bailee DesRocher as Waitress

Episode list

Reception
NYCGraphicNovelists reviewer Jared Gniewek states "SuperFuckers tends to feel disjointed and chaotic. Almost a stream of consciousness. On this level the book is solid and rewarding (and pretty funny)." Chris Sims of ComicsAlliance says its one of the funniest comics he's ever read.

References

External links
Official website
SuperF***ers (censored) on YouTube
Hangover Uncensored on YouTube
Newsarama interview with James Kochalka about SuperF*ckers

2005 comics debuts
2012 web series debuts
2013 web series endings
American adult animated action television series
American adult animated adventure television series
American adult animated comedy television series
American adult animated superhero television series
American adult animated web series
American flash animated web series
English-language television shows
YouTube original programming
Frederator Studios
Internet memes
American comics